Christine Davis (born 1960) is a Canadian artist.

Christine Davis may also refer to:

Christine Davis, producer of Busytown Mysteries
Christine Davis, a character in Stepfather III
Christine Davis, a character played by Erin Daniels

See also
Anne-Christine Davis, scientist
Christina Davis (disambiguation)
Chris Davis (disambiguation)